
Kozienice County is a unit of territorial administration and local government (powiat) in Masovian Voivodeship, east-central Poland. It came into being on 1 January 1999 as a result of the Polish local government reforms passed in 1998.

As of 2019, its total population is 60,253, out of which the population of Kozienice is 17,208 and the rural population is 43,045.

The county includes part of the protected area called Kozienice Landscape Park.

Neighbouring counties
Kozienice County is bordered by Garwolin County to the north, Ryki County to the east, Puławy County to the south-east, Zwoleń County to the south, Radom County to the south-west, and Białobrzegi County and Grójec County to the west.

Administrative division
The county is subdivided into seven gminas (one urban-rural and six rural). These are listed in the following table, in descending order of population.

References

 
Kozienice